The 1997–98 Omani League was the 23rd edition of the top football league in Oman. Oman Club were the defending champions, having won the previous 1996–97 Omani League season. Al-Nasr S.C.S.C. emerged as the champions of the 1997–98 Omani League with a total of 38 points.

Teams
This season the league had decreased from 12 to 10 teams. Al-Suwaiq Club, Al-Bustan Club, Fanja SC and Ruwi Club were relegated to the Second Division League after finishing in the relegation zone in the 1996–97 season. The two relegated teams were replaced Second Division League teams Quriyat Club and Buraimi SC.

Stadia and locations

League table

Top level Omani football league seasons
1997–98 in Omani football
Oman